Alexey Igorevich Korovashkov (born 1 April 1992) is a Russian canoeist.

Career
He has won a bronze medal at the 2012 Summer Olympics in the C-2 1000 m event. In June 2015, he competed in the inaugural European Games, for Russia in canoe sprint, more specifically, Men's C-2 1000m. He earned a silver medal.

In 2016 Alexey has been barred from all international competitions by the International Canoe Federation.

References

1992 births
Russian male canoeists
Living people
Canoeists at the 2012 Summer Olympics
Olympic canoeists of Russia
Olympic bronze medalists for Russia
Olympic medalists in canoeing
ICF Canoe Sprint World Championships medalists in Canadian
Medalists at the 2012 Summer Olympics
European Games medalists in canoeing
Canoeists at the 2015 European Games
European Games silver medalists for Russia